Parrotia persica, the Persian ironwood, is a deciduous tree in the family Hamamelidaceae, closely related to the witch-hazel genus Hamamelis. It is native to Iran's Caspian region (where it is called  ) and Iranian Azerbaijan (where it is called ). It is endemic in the Alborz mountains, where it is found mainly in Golestan National Park.

The species was named by Carl Anton von Meyer to honor his predecessor at the University of Dorpat, German naturalist Georg Friedrich Parrot., who botanized in the Alborz on a mountaineering expedition in the 1830s.

Another species Parrotia subaequalis (commonly called Chinese ironwood)  originates from eastern China. There are five disjunct populations of P. subaequalis in eastern China: two each in Jiangsu and Zhejiang provinces (Huang et al. 2005) and one in Anhui (Shao and Fang 2004). A full account of this sibling species can be found in an article "The Chinese Parrotia: A Sibling Species of the Persian Parrotia" by Jianhua Li and Peter Del Tredici.

This species is listed as critically endangered by the IUCN (under its former name of Shaniodendron subaequale, which is no longer an accepted name for the species). P. subaequalis is also considered critically endangered (Grade I Key protected Wild Plant) in the China Red Data Book, with a very narrow distribution range. The five known relict populations of P. subaequalis comprise no more than 100 reproductive individuals. Therefore, this species has high conservation priority.

Description
The bark is smooth, pinkish-brown flaking/peeling to leave a mosaic of cinnamon, pink, green, and pale yellow patches in a similar manner to plane trees.

The fruit is a two-parted capsule containing two seeds, one in each half.

Fossil record
Among the middle Miocene Sarmatian palynoflora from the Lavanttal Basin, Austria, researchers have recognized Parrotia fossil pollen. The sediment containing it had accumulated in a lowland wetland environment with various vegetation units of mixed evergreen/deciduous broadleaved/conifer forests surrounding the wetland basin. Key relatives of the fossil taxa found with Parrotia are presently confined to humid warm temperate environments, suggesting a subtropical climate during the middle Miocene in Austria.

Cultivation
Parrotia persica is cultivated as an ornamental tree for its brilliant autumn colour and the smooth, patterned bark. As an uncommon, drought-tolerant garden tree of moderate size, it is prized for its striking autumn colour and the exfoliating bark that develops on mature specimens.

Several cultivars have been selected for garden planting:
 'Horizontalis': semi-weeping, wide-spreading horizontal branching pattern.
 'Pendula' (Kew Form): Compact, weeping, quite graceful
 'Select': Young leaves have purple margins, otherwise same as species
 'Vanessa': Upright, columnar habit

'Vanessa' has gained the Royal Horticultural Society’s Award of Garden Merit.

Gallery

References

External links

Hamamelidaceae
Trees of Western Asia
Trees of Azerbaijan
Endemic flora of Iran
Endemic flora of Azerbaijan
Ornamental trees